David Marshall is an American politician, former police officer, pastor and Republican member of the Arizona House of Representatives elected to represent District 7 in 2022.

Early life & career
Marshall was raised in California, graduating from high school in Santa Ana, California. He then joined the United States Air Force, and after being honorably discharged joined the Santa Ana Police Department. Marshall moved with his family to Snowflake, Arizona in 1999, where he ran a safehouse for battered women, and also became ordained as a pastor.

Elections
2022 Marshall and David Cook won a three-way contest in the Republican Primary, defeating incumbent State Representative John Fillmore. They went on to defeat Independent write-in candidate Chris Verrill, as there were no Democratic nominees for the position.

References

External links
 Biography at Ballotpedia

Republican Party members of the Arizona House of Representatives
Living people
Year of birth missing (living people)
21st-century American politicians
People from Snowflake, Arizona